Sir Richard William Scott,  (February 24, 1825 – April 23, 1913) was a Canadian politician and cabinet minister.

Early life
He was born in Prescott, Ontario, in 1825, a descendant of a family from County Clare. A lawyer by training, Scott was admitted to the bar in 1848 and established a practice in Bytown (now Ottawa).

Political career
Scott became a member of municipal council in 1851, was mayor of Bytown in 1852, and held a seat in the Legislative Assembly of the Province of Canada from 1857 to 1863. With Canadian Confederation, Scott won a seat in the Ontario legislature as a Liberal representing Ottawa from 1867 to 1871. He was Speaker of the legislature briefly in December 1871 before he was appointed to the provincial cabinet as Commissioner of Crown Lands. Scott played a leading role in passing legislation ensuring the rights of separate schools in Ontario.

In November 1873, he left provincial politics when he was appointed minister without portfolio by Alexander Mackenzie in the federal Cabinet. Mackenzie had become prime minister after Sir John A. Macdonald's government had been forced to resign because of the Pacific Scandal. Scott was appointed to the Senate of Canada by Mackenzie in January 1874 and became Secretary of State for Canada and Leader of the Government in the Senate.

A supporter of temperance, he drafted the "Scott Act," which allowed any county or municipality in Canada to prohibit the retail sale of liquor by majority vote. With the defeat of the Liberal government in the 1878 election, Scott became Leader of the Opposition in the Senate until the return of the Liberals to government, under Wilfrid Laurier. Scott resumed his old Cabinet position of Secretary of State.

Scott retired from the cabinet in 1908 but remained in the Senate until his death in 1913.

He was made a knight in 1909 by King Edward VII.

Family

Richard William Scott was married in Philadelphia, Pa., November 8, 1853, to Mary Heron, the daughter of John Heron and Frances, his wife. She was born and educated in Dublin, Ireland. The couple had two sons William L. Scott, Local Master in Chancery, and D Arcy Scott, Barrister,
Ottawa and four daughters.  Before her marriage, Mrs. Scott was a professional singer who toured in Canada and the United States as a member of "The Heron sisters."  The couple lived at 274 Daly Avenue, Ottawa. She served on the Executive Committee of the National Council of Women and as a Vice-President of the Local Council.

Archives 
There is a Richard William Scott fonds at Library and Archives Canada.

References

External links 
 
 
 Member's Parliamentary History at the Legislative Assembly of Ontario
 Sir Richard Scott, PC , KC

1825 births
1913 deaths
Mayors of Bytown
Canadian Knights Bachelor
Lawyers in Ontario
Canadian King's Counsel
Canadian senators from Ontario
Canadian people of Irish descent
Liberal Party of Canada senators
Members of the Legislative Assembly of the Province of Canada from Canada West
Members of the King's Privy Council for Canada
People from Leeds and Grenville United Counties
Speakers of the Legislative Assembly of Ontario
Persons of National Historic Significance (Canada)
Canadian temperance activists
Ontario Liberal Party MPPs